Nazar Milishchuk (born June 5, 1986) is a Ukrainian footballer who is currently playing with FC Ukraine United in the Ontario Soccer League.

Playing career

Europe 
Milishchuk played in the Ukrainian First League in 2009 with FC Enerhetyk Burshtyn for two seasons. In 2011, he played in the Ukrainian Football Amateur League with FC Sambir. The following season he played with FC Mykolaiv, and returned to the professional level in 2012 to play with FC Stal Dniprodzerzhynsk in the Ukrainian Second League. In 2014, he went abroad to play in the IV liga with LKS Sawa Sonina. After a season in Poland he returned to the Ukrainian Second League to play with NK Veres Rivne.

He returned to Poland in 2015 to play in the Klasa A, and III liga with LKS Cresovia Krzeczowice, and LKS Wólczanka Wólka Pełkińska. He later returned to Ukrainian Football Amateur League to play with FC Mykolaiv.

Canada 
In 2018, he went to Canada play in the Canadian Soccer League with FC Ukraine United, where he won the First Division title. In his sophomore season he participated in the CSL Championship final against Scarborough SC, but in a losing effort. He played in the Ontario Soccer League in 2021 with Ukraine United.

References 

1986 births
Living people
Ukrainian footballers
FC Enerhetyk Burshtyn players
FC Sambir players
FC Mykolaiv players
NK Veres Rivne players
FC Ukraine United players
Ukrainian First League players
Canadian Soccer League (1998–present) players
Association football forwards
Ukrainian expatriate footballers
Expatriate footballers in Poland
Expatriate soccer players in Canada
Ukrainian Second League players
III liga players
IV liga players